Drinan or Drinnan may refer to:

People with the surname 
Dan Drinan (born 1960), American sprint car driver
Aaron Drinan (born 1998), Irish footballer
Jimmy Drinnan (1906–1936), Scottish footballer
Keith Drinan (1924–2004), Australian footballer
Robert Drinan (1920–2007), Jesuit priest and U.S. Representative from Massachusetts

Places 
 Drinan, Dublin a townland near Swords, Ireland
 Drinan, Queensland, a locality in the Bundaberg Region, Queensland, Australia
 Drinnan, Alberta, Canada, a former village
Drinnan Creek, Alberta, a tributary of the Gregg River

See also
Jeanie Drynan